Preston is a city on the north bank of the River Ribble in Lancashire, England. The city is the administrative centre of the county of Lancashire and the wider City of Preston local government district. Preston and its surrounding district obtained city status in 2002, becoming England's 50th city in the 50th year of Queen Elizabeth II's reign. Preston has a population of 114,300, the City of Preston district 132,000 and the Preston Built-up Area 313,322. The Preston Travel To Work Area, in 2011, had a population of 420,661, compared with 354,000 in the previous census. 

Preston and its surrounding area have provided evidence of ancient Roman activity, largely in the form of a Roman road that led to a camp at Walton-le-Dale. The Angles established Preston; its name is derived from the Old English meaning "priest's settlement" and in the Domesday Book is recorded as "Prestune". In the Middle Ages, Preston was a parish and township in the hundred of Amounderness and was granted a Guild Merchant charter in 1179, giving it the status of a market town. Textiles have been produced since the mid-13th century when locally produced wool was woven in people's houses. Flemish weavers who settled in the area in the 14th century helped develop the industry. In the early-18th century, Edmund Calamy described Preston as "a pretty town with an abundance of gentry in it, commonly called Proud Preston". Sir Richard Arkwright, inventor of the spinning frame, was born in the town. The most rapid period of growth and development coincided with the industrialisation and expansion of textile manufacturing. Preston was a boomtown of the Industrial Revolution, becoming a densely populated engineering centre, with large industrial plants. The town's textile sector fell into terminal decline from the mid-20th century and Preston has subsequently faced similar challenges to other post-industrial northern towns, including deindustrialisation, economic deprivation and housing issues.

Preston is the seat of Lancashire County Council, houses the main campus of the University of Central Lancashire (UCLan) and is home to Preston North End F.C., a founder member of the Football League and the first English football champions.

The demonym for residents of the city is "Prestonian".

Toponymy
Various other spellings occur in early documents: Prestonam (1094), Prestone (1160), Prestona (1160), Presteton (1180), and Prestun (1226). The modern spelling occurs in 1094, 1176, 1196, 1212, and 1332.

History

Early development
During the Roman period, Roman roads passed close to what is now the centre of Preston.

An explanation of the origin of the name is that the Priest's Town refers to a priory set up by St Wilfrid near the Ribble's lowest ford. This idea is supported by the similarity of the Paschal lamb on Preston's crest with that on St Wilfrid's.

When first mentioned in the 1086 Domesday Book, Preston was already the most important town in Amounderness (the area of Central Lancashire between the rivers Ribble and Cocker, including The Fylde and the Forest of Bowland). When assessed for tax purposes in 1218 – 19 it was the wealthiest town in the whole county.

Guild Merchant

The right to hold a Guild Merchant was conferred by King Henry II upon the burgesses of Preston in a charter of 1179; the associated Preston Guild is a civic celebration held every 20 years and 2012 was the latest guild year. It is the only guild still celebrated in the UK.

Before 1328, celebrations were held at irregular intervals, but at the guild of that year it was decreed that subsequent guilds should be held every 20 years. After this, there were breaks in the pattern for various reasons, but an unbroken series were held from 1542 to 1922. A full 400-year sequence was frustrated by the cancellation of the 1942 guild due to World War II, but the cycle resumed in 1952. The expression '(Once) every Preston Guild', meaning 'very infrequently', has passed into fairly common use, especially in Lancashire.

Guild week is always started by the opening of the Guild Court, which since the 16th century has traditionally been on the first Monday after the feast of the Beheading of John the Baptist celebrated on 29 August. As well as concerts and other exhibitions, the main events are a series of processions through the city. Numerous street parties are held in the locality.

In 1952 the emphasis was on the bright new world emerging after the war. The major event, held in the city's Avenham Park, had every school participating, and hundreds of children, from toddlers to teenagers, demonstrated different aspects of physical education in the natural amphitheatre of the park.

The 2012 guild formally opened on 2 September with a mayoral proclamation and the return of "friendship scrolls" that had travelled the world. Highlights in the programme for the 2012 celebration included two concerts in Avenham Park - one by Human League and another, a "Proms In The Park", featuring José Carreras, Katherine Jenkins and the Manchester Camerata.

Pre-industrial Preston

In the mid-12th century, Preston was in the hundred of Amounderness, in the deanery of Amounderness and the archdeaconry of Richmond. The name "Amounderness" is more ancient than the name of any other "Wapentake" or hundred in the County of Lancashire, and the fort at Tulketh, strengthened by William the Conqueror, shows that the strategic importance of the area was appreciated even then.

The location of the city, almost exactly midway between Glasgow and London, led to many confrontations with Scotland. Preston was burned by the Scots during The Great Raid of 1322 but two years later had quickly recovered. Decisive battles were also fought here, most notably during the English Civil War at the Battle of Preston (1648), and then the first Jacobite rebellion, whose invasion of England was brought to a conclusion by the defeat of the pro-Catholic and pro-monarchial Jacobite army at the Battle of Preston (1715). Letitia Elizabeth Landon alludes to this latter defeat in her poetical illustration, Preston, to an engraving of a painting by Thomas Allom, in Fisher's Drawing Room Scrap Book 1834.

In the last great Jacobite Rising, on 27 November 1745 the Jacobite Prince of Wales and Regent, Bonnie Prince Charlie passed through Preston with his Highland Army on the way south through Chorley and Manchester to Derby intending to take London and the Crown. Preston was the first of quite a few places in England where the Prince was cheered as he rode by and where he was joined by some English volunteers for his Army. One Jacobite eyewitness noted that from Preston onwards, "at every town we were received with ringing of bells, and at night we have bonfires, and illuminations". Another Jacobite eyewitness noted in a private letter from Preston on 27 November 1745: "People here are beginning to join [us] very fast; we have got about sixty recruits today".  From 10 to 12 December the Prince gave his retreating Army a rest in Preston on their long, last and fatal retreat from Derby through Lancaster and Carlisle to their dreadful day of destiny the following 16 April on Culloden Moor near Inverness.

Industrial revolution
The 19th century saw a transformation in Preston from a small market town to a much larger industrial one, as the innovations of the latter half of the previous century such as Richard Arkwright's water frame (invented in Preston) brought cotton mills to many northern English towns. With industrialisation came examples of both oppression and enlightenment.

The town's forward-looking spirit is typified by it being the first English town outside London to be lit by gas. The Preston Gas Company was established in 1815 by, amongst others, a Catholic priest: Rev. Joseph "Daddy" Dunn of the Society of Jesus. The Preston and Wigan Railway arrived in 1838, shortly afterwards renamed the North Union Railway. The Sheffield firm of Thos. W. Ward Ltd opened a ship breaking yard at Preston Dock in 1894.

The more oppressive side of industrialisation was seen during the Preston Strike of 1842 on Saturday 13 August 1842, when a group of cotton workers demonstrated against the poor conditions in the town's mills. The Riot Act was read and armed troops corralled the demonstrators in front of the Corn Exchange on Lune Street. Shots were fired and four of the demonstrators were killed. A commemorative sculpture now stands on the spot (although the soldiers and demonstrators represented are facing the wrong way). In the 1850s, Karl Marx visited Preston and later described the town as "the next St Petersburg". Charles Dickens visited Preston in January 1854 during a strike by cotton workers that had by that stage lasted for 23 weeks. It is believed that the town of "Coketown" in the novel Hard Times was inspired by this visit to Preston.  In 1858, the Preston Power Loom Weavers' Association was founded, and by 1920 it had more than 13,000 members in the town.

The Preston Temperance Society, led by Joseph Livesey pioneered the Temperance Movement in the 19th century. Indeed, the term teetotalism is believed to have been coined at one of its meetings. The website of the University of Central Lancashire library has a great deal of information on Joseph Livesey and the Temperance Movement in Preston.

Preston was one of only a few industrial towns in Lancashire to have a functioning corporation (local council) in 1835 (its charter dating to 1685), and was reformed as a municipal borough by the Municipal Corporations Act 1835. It became the County Borough of Preston under the Local Government Act 1888. In 1974, county boroughs were abolished, and it became part of the larger part of the new non-metropolitan district, the Borough of Preston, which also included Fulwood Urban District and much of Preston Rural District. The borough acquired city status in 2002.

Preston since the early 20th century

By 1901, nearly 120,000 people were living in Preston, now a booming industrial town.

New industries arrived in Preston during the interwar years which helped ease the pain felt through the sharp decline of the cotton industry. Electrical goods manufacturing and engineering arrived in the town, and the building sector enjoyed a boom with nearly 3,000 council houses being built between 1920 and 1939. Some 1,500 houses were built for private sale.

Despite its heavy industry, Preston endured only a handful of Luftwaffe air raids in World War II and there were no fatalities in the town, although an air crash in the Freckleton district claimed the lives of 61 people in 1944.

For some 20 years after 1948, Preston became home to a significant number of Asian and Caribbean Commonwealth immigrants, who mostly worked in the manufacturing industry. However, an economic decline hit the town once again in the 1970s, capped by the closure of the Courtaulds factory in 1979 (nearly 3,000 job losses) and the decline of the docks on the River Ribble, which finally closed in 1981. Mass unemployment was firmly back in Preston by the early 1980s, although it was now very much a national crisis due to the recession of that time.

The rehousing of families from town centre slums to new council houses continued after World War II, though it slowed down to a virtual standstill after 1975.  The face of the town centre began to change in the 1960s, with old developments being bulldozed and replaced by modern developments such as the St George's Shopping Centre, which opened in 1966, and the Fishergate Shopping Centre which was built nearly 20 years later. The remains of the Victorian town hall, designed by George Gilbert Scott and mostly destroyed by fire in 1947, were replaced by an office block (Crystal House) in 1962, and a modern-architecture Guild Hall opened in 1972, to replace the Public Hall.

The town was by-passed by Britain's very first motorway, built and operated by engineer James Drake, which was opened by Harold Macmillan in December 1958. Within a decade, this formed part of the M6 – giving Preston a direct motorway link with Manchester and Birmingham. The late 1960s saw the completion of Ringway, a bypass around the town centre, as well as a new bus station.

On 6 April 2012 the city's residents performed the Preston Passion, a dramatised version of the Passion of Christ, which was broadcast live by BBC One.

Governance

The unparished urban settlement of Preston is represented by 19 of the 22 council wards within Preston City Council which is based at Preston Town Hall on Lancaster Road. Preston is currently divided between two Westminster constituencies, namely Preston and Wyre and Preston North. The County Hall is located on Fishergate and is the main office for Lancashire County Council.

Geography

The River Ribble provides a southern border for the city. The Forest of Bowland forms a backdrop to Preston to the northeast while the Fylde lies to the west.

The current borders came into effect on 1 April 1974, when the Local Government Act 1972 merged the existing County Borough of Preston with Fulwood Urban District as an unparished area within the Borough of Preston. Preston was designated as part of the Central Lancashire new town in 1970.

Climate
The climate of Preston is of a temperate maritime type, with a narrow range of temperatures, similar to the rest of the British Isles. Being relatively close to the Irish sea, this is more pronounced than areas to the south and east of Preston.

The absolute high recorded at the weather station was  during August 1990. In October 2011, a new record October high temperature of 26.9 °C was set.

The lowest temperature in recent years was  during December 2010.

Annual rainfall totals just under 1000 mm per year, with over 1 mm of precipitation falling on 150 days. All averages refer to the period 1971–2000.

In October 2014 Preston was officially ranked "the wettest city in England", and third wettest in the UK behind Cardiff and Glasgow.  It was also ranked "the gloomiest city in England", as it gets fewer hours of sunshine in a year than any other English city or town. However, in March 2018 the Lancashire Evening Post reported that Preston has lost its "soggy city status" to the neighbouring city of Lancaster. 

Demographics

Religion

Preston has a strong Roman Catholic Christian history and tradition, recently noted by Archbishop Vincent Nichols in his Guild 2012 Mass Homily: "The history of the Christian and Catholic faith is long and deep here in Preston."  with one of the proposed derivations of its name coming from 'Priests town'. The lamb on the city shield is a biblical image of Jesus Christ, and the same image that represented 7th-century bishop St Wilfrid, the city's patron saint who is historically linked to the city's establishment. The "PP" on the city shield stands for "Princeps Pacis" (Prince of Peace), another title for Christ invoking Him as protector of the city, though it is also often taken to stand for the city's nickname "Proud Preston". In fact, there were originally three letters "P" on the coat of arms, with one being lost over time.

Preston lies in the Roman Catholic Diocese of Lancaster and the Anglican Diocese of Blackburn. There are at least 73 churches, chapels, missions and meeting houses, as well as 15 cemeteries and burial sites, for which records exist. A wide range of denominations are, or have been, represented in the city including: Latin Church Catholics, Baptist, Christadelphian, Congregational, Countess of Huntingdon's Connexion, Evangelical, Methodist, Pentecostal, Presbyterian, Swedenborgian and Wesleyan Methodist. The Society of Friends meet at the Preston Friends Meeting House at 189 St George's Road.

In July 2016, St Ignatius Church in Preston, which had been gifted by the Catholic Diocese of Lancaster to the Syro-Malabar Catholic community, was raised to the status of a cathedral by Pope Francis. It now serves as the seat of the Syro-Malabar Catholic Eparchy of Great Britain. 

Built in 1826 for the Calvinistic Methodists of Lady Huntington, the Carey Baptist church, on Pole Street, was formerly known as St Paul's Chapel. It was purchased by the Baptists in 1855. The church survives today and remains very active in the community.

St. John's Minster, formerly the Church of St John the Evangelist and prior to the reformation; St Wilfrid's Parish Church, is located on Church Street, in the centre of the city. From its origin, it has been the parish church of Preston. The church of St George the Martyr, located on Georges Road, was founded in 1723. One of the many large active Roman Catholic parish churches is St Thomas of Canterbury and the English Martyrs, located on Garstang Road.

Preston was the location of the world's first foreign mission of the Church of Jesus Christ of Latter-day Saints (commonly known as the Mormons). As early as 1837 the first Latter-day Saint missionaries to Great Britain began preaching in Preston and, in particular, other small towns situated along the River Ribble. Preston is home to the world's oldest continuous branch (a small congregation) of the church. An official memorial to the church pioneers may be found in the Japanese Garden in Avenham Park. In 1998 the church erected a large temple at Chorley, near Preston, described by The Telegraph newspaper as "spectacular".  The temple is officially known as the Preston England Temple.

Preston has a significant Muslim (Sunni Branch, particularly Hanafi school) population, the majority of which is of Gujarati Indian descent. The Muslim population is centred in the Deepdale, Riversway, Fishwick, Fulwood and Frenchwood areas. Preston has 12 mosques: five in Deepdale & St George's, one in Frenchwood, one in Riversway, two in Adelphi and three in Fishwick.

The 2001 Census recorded 72% of the population of the City of Preston as Christians, 10% as having no religion, and 8% as Muslims. The Hindu and Sikh populations are smaller at 3% and 0.6% respectively, but in both cases this represents the highest percentage of any local authority area in the North West. 2% of the city's population were born in other EU countries. Though still small in number in Preston, the Latter-day Saints maintain a large profile.

Preston has places of worship for people of a wide variety of religions, including churches of many Christian denominations. There are also places of worship for Buddhists, Hindus, Muslims, the Jehovah's Witnesses, Latter-day Saints, Sikhs and The Salvation Army, amongst others. Preston was also home to an Ashkenazi Orthodox Jewish synagogue on Avenham Place, formed in 1882, but this closed during the mid-1980s.

Landmarks

There are also many notable buildings dotted in and around the city centre including the Miller Arcade, the Town Hall, the Harris Museum, the Minster Church of St. John the Evangelist (formerly Preston Parish Church, elevated to Minster church status in June 2003), the former Corn Exchange and Public Hall, St. Wilfrid's Catholic Church, Fishergate Baptist Church, and many beautiful Georgian buildings on Winckley Square. Many Catholic and Anglican parish churches are also to be found throughout the city. HMP Preston is also a good example of a typical Victorian radial-design prison. Modern architecture is represented by the Guild Hall and Preston bus station, which was featured on the 2012 World Monument Fund's list of sites at risk due to threats of demolition, before becoming Grade II listed.

Listed buildings

The chimney of the Grade II listed Tulketh Mill, recently fully exposed on Blackpool Road, provides an impressive reminder of Preston's industrial heritage. The mill itself, designed by engineer Fred Dixon of Bolton for the Tulketh Spinning Company, dates from 1905. The huge chimney has been lowered twice – in the 1930s and again in the 1960s.

Monuments and public artworks
Preston has a number of notable monuments and public artworks, including:
 Obelisk: located opposite the Cenotaph on Preston's Market Square, the Obelisk dates back to 1782 and was originally installed for the Guild celebration of the same year.
 Peace Gardens: located on Friargate, the gardens, designed by Graham Mort, originally housed the praying hands sculpture which now resides on Fylde Road.
 Preston Martyrs' Memorial: located in front of the Corn Exchange in Lune Street, this sculpture marks the site of the Lune Street Riots which occurred during the 1842 General Strike, when troops opened fire on striking mills workers, killing four and injuring three.
 "The Splash": a sculpture of Tom Finney, located in front of the Deepdale football stadium. The statue is based upon a famous photo taken of Finney in a game against Chelsea in 1956, which was named England's Sports Photograph of the Year.
 A bronze Wallace and Gromit bench statue, with Wallace in Wrong Trousers and Gromit reading his newspaper on the bench, was erected in September 2021 at the south market hall entrance to the Covered Market to commemorate its creator Nick Park, who originated from Preston.
 Cotton Reel: designed by artist designed by Van Nong, this sculpture of a large cotton reel and needle is located in Avenham Road (between the city centre and Avenham Park) and commemorates the former Simpsons Gold Thread Works, which advanced the science of gold thread manufacture and from 1839 provided gold and silver thread for the military, royalty, cruise ships (including the Titanic), and Freemasons.
 Landscape With Trees: designed by artist Clare Bigger, this series of four metre high stainless steel pylons of stylised trees is located in Friargate in the city centre.

Economy
Preston has seen many changes over the course of its history in regards to its local economy, shifting from a market town to the textile industry and more recently to tertiary education and research.

The city was home to Alstom Transport's main UK spare parts distribution centre (formerly GEC Traction Ltd) until it transferred operations to Widnes in July 2018. Matalan Retail Ltd was also founded in Preston under the name Matalan Cash and Carry. Although the head office of Matalan moved to Skelmersdale in 1998, the city still has the tax office for the company (located in Winckley Square).

Goss Graphic Systems Limited, a global supplier of printing presses based in the United States, formerly employed more than 1,000 people in Preston, but in 2007 the company moved manufacturing to the United States, China and Japan and now has around 160 employees in the city.

Unemployment in Preston rose 15% in the year up to April 2012 to a total of 3,783 claimants. However, in November 2018 Preston was named as "Most improved city in UK", with unemployment down to 3.1% from 6.5% in 2014, and improvements above the national average for health, transport, the work-life balance of its residents, and for the skills among both the youth and adult populations.

Major employers
Preston is a major centre of the British defence aerospace industry with BAE Systems, the UK's principal military aircraft design, development and manufacture supplier, having its Military Aircraft headquarters located in nearby Warton. The company has two of its major facilities located some miles on either side of the city. BAE Warton is located to the western side of the city whilst BAE Samlesbury is located to the east, over the M6 motorway. BAE Systems also operate large office facilities at the Portway area within the city and at The Strand office complex.

On 20 February 2006, the telecommunications company The Carphone Warehouse took over Tulketh Mill (formerly the home of the Littlewoods catalogue call centre) in the Ashton-on-Ribble area of the city. The building has undergone an extensive interior refurbishment and since March 2007 had been the workplace of some 800 employees. The site's main purpose was as a call centre for the broadband and landline services provider TalkTalk as well as The Post Office and Student Loans Company. The site also housed call centres for Team Knowhow and Carphone Warehouse which are now part of Dixons Carphone. It was officially opened on 19 December 2006 by CEO Charles Dunstone and the Mayor of Preston. Following the COVID-19 pandemic, Dixons Carphone along with other tenants within Tulketh Mill, moved to a hybrid working solution (time split between working from home and working from the office), eventually moving to a permanent working from home solution and as of August 2022 Dixons Carphone no longer have any operations based in Tulketh Mill.

Due to Preston's location as a transport hub, sitting between the M6, M55, M65, and M61 it is home to several freight and haulage companies. Haulage supplier and operator James Hall and Co who supply produce for Spar stores in the north of England have their head office - the biggest building in the city of Preston - located just off the M6 Junction 31a at Bowland View.

The Riversway area (in the Ashton-on-Ribble area of the city) is also home to the Preston Docklands, once Europe's largest single dock basin, which has undergone redevelopment. Several office areas around the docks, along with significant residential presence. Several small businesses such as the Football League's LFE headquarters  are based in the area, together with Riversway Developments who have been responsible for some of this redevelopment.

The financial sector also has a presence in the city with a large selection of consultancies, insurance and law firms based in Winckley Square in the city centre.

The Westinghouse Electric Company (formerly BNFL) Springfields nuclear processing plant also lies to the west of the city boundary at Salwick.

Skiddle is an event ticketing operation based in Preston since 2001, which claims to be the UK's largest what's on the guide.

Retail

Retail is also a major contributor to Preston's economy. The city's main high streets are Fishergate and Friargate which offer shops, bars and restaurants with many more tucked away down the side streets. Two major shopping centres are located along the high streets:
Fishergate Shopping Centre – which had a Debenhams department store (closed May 2021), McDonald's, Poundland, Starbucks, Lush, Sports Direct, TK Maxx and Argos stores.
St George's Shopping Centre (formerly The Mall Preston) – a popular centrally located shopping mall dating from the 1960s.

Preston is also home to the historic Covered Market and Fishmarket. In 2016 these sites were redeveloped and the old covered market now contains the new Market Hall and Outdoor and Secondhand Markets, and the old fish market now contains the Box Market, a unique shopping space consisting of upgraded shipping containers. Market vendors sell fresh and local quality meat, fish, fruit, vegetables, and dairy products, hot and cold food to eat in or take away, as well as brewed ales and artisan coffee. The markets are open Monday-Saturday and on Tuesdays, a Car boot sale operates from the Outdoor Market 

Also in the city centre is the Miller Arcade, a specialist shopping centre in a listed building (which formerly included public baths), is situated off Fishergate near the Harris Museum.

The first Kentucky Fried Chicken (KFC) outlet in the UK was opened on Fishergate in 1965.

A number of large retail shopping centres can be found in Preston's suburbs and surrounding towns, including:
Capitol Centre Retail Park on the A6 London Road to the south of the city at Walton-le-Dale. The centre has over 20 major stores including Boots, Carphone Warehouse, Curry's-PC World, Gap Outlet, Next and TK Maxx, and various fast-food restaurants including McDonalds, Starbucks and Subway.  There is also a Vue Cinema, and Tesco and Waitrose supermarkets. Free car parking is provided along with a bus interchange.
Deepdale Shopping park, on the A5085 Blackpool Road on the northern edge of the city, has over 30 major stores including Boots, Carphone Warehouse, Halfords, Marks & Spencer, Next and Wilko, and various fast-food restaurants including KFC, McDonalds and Pizza Hut. There is also an Aldi supermarket, as well as a Morrisons nearby. Free parking is provided for over 1,000 cars.
Riversway Retail Park, located off the A583 Riversway at Ashton-on-Ribble. Stores include home furnishings providers Bensons For Beds, DFS and ScS Sofa Carpet Specialist. Other retailers include Halfords and Pets At Home, and there is a Morrisons Supermarket,B&M and a McDonalds fast-food restaurant. Nearby is an Odeaon cinema, KFC and a Chiquito restaurant. Free parking is provided.
South Rings Business Park, located off the A6 at Bamber Bridge, near the intersection of the M6, M65 and M61 motorways. There are Aldi and Sainsburys supermarkets, B&Q DIY, Matalan, Burger King fast-food restaurant and the Walton Fox country pub and restaurant. Free car parking is provided.

Education and research
The University of Central Lancashire ("UCLan ") has become a major employer and source of economic growth not just for Preston in recent years, but for Lancashire as a whole, providing direct and indirect benefits to the local economy through employment, housing and retail.

The Regeneris Report commissioned by the Lancashire County Council in 2013/14 found that UCLan:
 contributed over £200m to the North West economy
 was one of the largest employers in Preston and supported an estimated 4,300 Full-Time Equivalent (FTE) jobs in the North West through its core economic footprint and through the expenditure of students
 with 36,160 students was the largest university in Lancashire and the third-largest in the North West, with the 9th largest undergraduate population of all UK universities
 graduates add on average £24m to the North West economy per annum through increased skills and productivity

In terms of direct economic benefits, in 2013/14 UCLan:
 directly employed 3,290 staff 
 spent £15 million on suppliers based throughout Lancashire and the wider North West area
 had 18,390 full-time students residing in the North West who spent a total of £210m throughout the region, with £155m of that being spent in Lancashire.

In 2015, UCLan announced its intention to create historic and transformational change at its Preston Campus through a £200 million development programme entitled Campus Masterplan 2020. UCLan's vision over the next five years is to create a unified, sustainable and welcoming campus which will enhance the experience for all those visiting the university. The long-term vision is to spark a major focus on regeneration and business investment in the University quarter, reinforce the university's ties to the local community and create wider benefits for Preston and beyond.

September 2019 saw the opening of the £35 million Engineering Innovation Centre (EIC), a facility with integrated teaching and research space.

Also under development is the £57 million Student Centre and public square, which will provide a new campus reception building housing several student services, meeting rooms, office space, event venues and a rooftop garden. The new public square, provisionally known as Adelphi Square, will span over 8,400 square metres and will be constructed in front of the new student centre and opposite the EIC, on empty land that was previously the site of the Fylde Building and public land bought by UCLan from the council. The project has seen the demolition of existing housing in St Peter's Square opposite the UCLan Library and St Peter's Arts Centre, and redevelopment of the A583 and other nearby public roadways, including the Adelphi roundabout, which will result in revised traffic flows. Construction commenced in the third quarter of 2019 and is expected to be completed in 2021. On 30 July 2021 UCLan officially took ownership of the new Student Centre and University Square (which had provisionally been known as Adephi Square) when a ceremonial key was presented to the university's Vice-Chancellor, Professor Graham Baldwin, by the project's major contractor Bowmer + Kirkland. The building became operational in September 2021.

As UCLan increases in the global rankings, it continues to attract more international students, researchers and Fellows, as well as partnerships with international learning institutions. It is anticipated that further economics benefits from increased foreign investment and business opportunities should entail.

Proposed developments
An £800 million regeneration project known as the Tithebarn Project was also planned for Preston. The project was originally managed by property giants Grosvenor and Lendlease, Grosvenor withdrew from the project, followed a few years later by Lendlease. The project was dependent upon a number of requirements (such as the re-location of the current bus station, which would cost at least £25million, and be funded largely by the taxpayer). In November 2011, it was announced that John Lewis, who were originally intended to be the major flagship store of the Tithebarn development had also withdrawn from the project, effectively killing it. The council is now exploring more piecemeal ways of bringing in development and former Labour leader Jeremy Corbyn praises Preston for its "inspiring innovation".

Since city status was awarded in 2002, Preston has been targeted by a number of developers. Residential developments were particularly popular with new apartments planned in and around the city centre. Many of these developments however are still struggling to find buyers for these apartments, and there are rising numbers of repossessions.  Office and hotel space is also in demand and a new Central Business District is being planned as well as a number of new hotels.

Transport

Road

The Preston By-pass, opened 5 December 1958, became the first stretch of motorway in the UK and is now part of the M6 with a short section now forming part of the M55. It was built to ease traffic congestion caused by tourists travelling to the popular destinations of Blackpool and The Lake District. The first traffic cones were used during its construction, replacing red lantern paraffin burners.

In the 1980s, a motorway around the west of the city which would have been an extension of the M65 to the M55 was started but never finished. Originally, the M55 had no junction 2, because it was reserved for this new western bypass; however the construction of junction 2 began in 2019 and will create a link with the A583, close to the Riversway Docklands, in order to alleviate traffic on the M55 and the A6 at the Broughton Interchange to the north of Preston. The project is known as the Preston Western Distributor. The M6 between junctions 30 and 32 was widened extensively between 1993–95 to compensate. Junction 31A which has only a northbound exit and a southbound entry opened in 1997 to serve a nearby business park.

Other motorways terminating close to the city are the M61 – Preston to Manchester via Chorley and Bolton,
the M65 – Preston to Colne via Blackburn, Accrington and Burnley and the M55 – Preston to Blackpool via Kirkham.

Rail

Preston has a long history with the railways. Preston railway station opened in 1838 and has since been rebuilt and extended several times. It is a major stop on the West Coast Main Line between London and Scotland. It also provides for local services around Preston as well as regional services to the Fylde Coast, Cumbria and the Lake District, and various towns and cities in Lancashire, Merseyside and Yorkshire.

The station has nine (9) platforms, eight (8) of which are in public use, and access is provided for the mobility-impaired. Facilities include:
 Staffed ticket office (limited hours) and self-service ticket machines
 Cafes and news agency
 Lost property office
 Toilets
 Waiting lounges
 Taxi rank
 Bus stop (near by)

The station is open 24 hours a day, 7 days a week, and is managed by Avanti West Coast. For local passenger services around Preston, there are also stations at Bamber Bridge and Lostock Hall.

The lines to Southport and Longridge closed to passengers in 1965 and 1930 respectively. The disused tracks of the Longridge line are extant as far as Deepdale. In 2010 plans were put forward to use part of this line for a demonstration tram system.

Current routes and operators 
As at May 2022 the station is serviced by the following rail operators providing passenger services on the following routes:

 Avanti West Coast: provides regular services between:
 London Euston and Blackpool via  Birmingham New Street or Nuneaton
 London Euston and Edinburgh via Birmingham
 London Euston and Glasgow via Birmingham or Nuneaton
 Caledonian Sleeper: an overnight sleeper service operating between London to Scotland; only the Highland Sleeper stops at Preston (the Lowland Sleeper is express to and from Carlisle). Northbound services operates from Euston station in London to Waverley station in Edinburgh, where the train divides into three different trains for the final destinations of Aberdeen, Fort William and Inverness. Southbound services are the reverse, whereby the three trains come together at Edinburgh and continue south to London as one.
 Northern Trains: provides regular services to many destinations in the North including:
 Blacpool North via Poulton-le-Fylde
 Blackpool South via Lytham
 Bradford Interchange via Blackburn
 Carlisle via Barrow in Furness
 Huddersfield or Wakefield via Hebden Bridge
 Liverpool Lime Street) via Wigan
 Manchester Piccadilly or Manchester Victoria via Bolton
 Morecambe via Lancaster
Ormskirk via Croston
 Windermere via Kendal
 TransPennine Express: provides regular services between:
 Manchester Airport and Edinburgh via Carlisle
 Manchester Airport and Glasgow via Carlisle

Former stations 
Although Preston is now only served by its main railway station, in the preceding decades there were a number of other stations which have since closed (and many demolished). The following is a list of former stations which were located within the boundaries of the current day City of Preston:

 Barton & Broughton
 Butler Street (goods only)
 Deepdale (Bridge)
 Deepdale Street
 Fishergate Hill
 Grimsargh
 Grimsargh WHR (separate station for the Whittingham Hospital railway)
 Lea Road
 Maudland Bridge
 Maudlands
 Maxwell House
  (goods only, serviced Oxheys Cattle Market)
 Ribbleton
 Whittingham Hospital

New stations 
In December 2020, the Lancashire County Council approved a proposal to construct a new station in Lea west of the city, to service new housing estates being built in the area. The proposed station will be located near the site of the former Lea Road station which closed in 1938.  Although a timeline is yet to be established and construction yet to begin, government funding of £22.3M (along with local funding of £21.M) is conditional that it must be spent by 2023.

Preston Dock branch line 
With the industrialisation of Preston in the 19th century a branch line was built in 1846 from Preston's mail station to carry goods to and from Victoria Quay on the River Ribble. With the opening of the Albert Edward Basin and the new Preston Dock in 1892, the number and length of tracks increased and at their peak grew to over 25 miles. 

With the closure of the docks in 1981 and its subsequent redevelopment, most of the tracks were removed and now only a small section remains, used by the Ribble Steam Railway (RSR) and for bitumen trains operating to and from the Total refinery at the Riversway industrial park.

A single station, Preston Riverside, is operated by the RSR for its heritage rail trips.

Water

Rivers and docks

River Ribble

The Ribble has played an important role in the history of Preston. Archaeological evidence confirms human settlement along its banks going back to neolithic times, as well as the Saxon and Roman eras.  The river was already a trading port by medieval times, increasing in use and importance in conjunction with the industrialisation of Preston, until the closure of the Port of Preston in 1981.

The river suffers from an on-going issue of sedimentation, and was regularly dredged downstream of Preston while the city had an active port. Since dredging operations ceased, silt from the river is now spreading more widely over the beaches of its estuary.

Preston Dock

It was the location of the Port of Preston at the Albert Edward Basin which opened in 1892 and is connected to the river by a series of locks. The dock provided a port for shipping and ferry operations until its closure in 1981.

Records show that Preston was already a trading port by the 12th century and from around the mid-14th century ships would come up the river to unload and shelter in a natural basin known in its time as 'Preston Anchorage', where the Moor Brook joined the Ribble. In 1806 the Ribble Navigation Company was formed, and construction of the New Quays wharf (later renamed Victoria Quay) commenced a few years later further downstream along the section of the river where Marsh Lane joined Strand Road.

Sedimentation and the shallowness of the Ribble limited access to Victoria Quay to when the tide was high, and it was proposed that the river be diverted and an artificial tidal basin created whose water level could be controlled to allow 24-hour loading and unloading operations. In 1884 diversion of the Ribble began along with and the excavation of the what was to be the Albert Edward Basin along its northern bank, and in June 1892 the new Preston Dock was opened.  However, the on-going issue of sedimentation required constant dredging of the Ribble and along with loss of trade to large ports around the country, the docks never returned a profit, leading to their closure in October 1981.

Redevelopment of the former docks began in 1985 and continued through to 1992. Renamed Riversway, the first of the new retail and industrial estates, along with new roads, were opened in July 1987.  Development of residential housing commenced in 1989, with the new estate along the basin's southern shore named Victoria Quay after the earlier docks.

These days, the Albert Edward basin is used only for leisure activities, is home to many waterbirds. A public marina is located on its northwestern end, and access to and from the River Ribble is provided through the basin's original locks, operated by the Preston City Council; operating times are seasonal.

Canals and waterways

Lancaster Canal

The Lancaster Canal runs from Preston to Kendal in Cumbria. It was originally planned to join the Leeds and Liverpool Canal at Westhoughton and while the section north to near Chorley was built, the section south from Preston was never built. Instead, a "temporary" bridge - which still stands today - was constructed over the Ribble near Avenham Park, and a tramway operated from 1803 to Walton Summit.

From 1820 packet boats carried passengers between Preston and Kendal, providing faster journeys than the stagecoaches of the day, and by 1833 travel time had been reduced to seven hours. From the 1930s leakage problems caused sections of the canal, now owned by the LMS Railway, around Kendal to be closed to public traffic. However, the canal remained navigable to coal traffic from Preston to the Kendal Gas Works until 1944, but in 1955 the whole canal was closed to all traffic by an Act of Parliament. Subsequently, sections of the canal were filled in, later to be re-opened as interest in the canal returned, and currently,  of the canal from Preston to Tewitfield near Carnforth is open to navigation.

At Preston the canal originally terminated at a large boat basin located in the city centre between Marsh Lane and the A59 Ring Road, on the western side of Corporation Street.  An aqueduct carried the canal from its current terminus on the northern side of Aqueduct Street in at Ashton-on-Ribble, past the former Maudlands railway station, paralleling the eastern side of the railway to the basin, where railway tracks, long since removed, provided access originally to Victoria Quay and later to the new Preston Dock.  Following the Second World War, as many industries around Preston closed, this section of the canal became derelict and in the 1960s it was filled in and a new terminus with mooring facilities built at Ashton. The land through which the canal ran is now the campus of the University of Central Lancashire, with the Sir Tom Finney Sports Centre located over the former boat slip, and the site of the boat basin now a small retail mall with an Aldi supermarket.

Originally the canal was isolated from the River Ribble, but this changed in 2002 with the opening of the Ribble Link.

Ribble Link

Opened in July 2002, the Ribble Link is a navigation waterway built along a section of the Savick Brook that connects the previously isolated Lancaster Canal to the River Ribble. Featuring a series of locks, the Link allows narrowboats and other small watercraft to transit between the two waterways.

Unlike a canal, vessels are not free to travel in either direction at any time. Traffic flow is controlled so that the Link can only be navigated in a specific direction on alternate days. The Link is only open for approximately 90 days between April and October, and is used by approximately 200 boats a year.

The Link is operated by the Canal & River Trust and requires annual dredging to remain navigable.

Proposed developments
In 2006 the Preston City Council, in conjunction with the South Ribble Borough Council, proposed a major development estimated at £800 million to redevelop the city's docks and large sections of the River Ribble. Known as Riverworks, the plan proposed new leisure facilities (watersports), landmark buildings, a new central park opposite Avenham Park, office and retail space, new residential developments and the re-opening of some of Preston's old canal with new facilities for a "park and boat ride" scheme. The proposal met with considerable resistance from the local community (with 74% of residents objecting) and leisure and environmental groups due to the potential loss of green space, impact upon ecosystems (especially fish populations) and increased risk of flooding resulted in protests and campaigns being organised to have the project cancelled. 

In December 2007 the Preston City Council pulled out of a major part of the Riversworks plan, the highly contentious Ribble Barrage, and stated the revised plan would only look at improving Preston Docklands (in particular, the on-going blue green algae problem) and extending the Lancaster Canal from its current terminus at Ashton into the city at the back of the University of Central Lancashire (near the site of the former boat basin which was filled in prior to the construction of the current campus). 

A subsequent change in council's Sustainable Community Strategy,  especially in regards to Environmental, Health and Well-being and  People and Communities policies and targets, resulted in a ban on development on green belt land, and along with city's new Local Plan, the remaining (re)development proposals within the Riverworks plan were abandoned.

Bus

Local, regional and national bus services operate from the Preston bus station, which is located on the southeast edge of the city centre off the A59 and claimed by some residents to be the largest or second largest station in Europe. 

In conjunction with car parking facilities at the bus station, local services operate to and from two park and rides located on the outskirts of the city to minimise private vehicular traffic in the city centre; one at Portway in the Riversway area, and the other off the A6 at Walton-le-Dale.

Local services
Many services between Preston and the surrounding area were operated by Ribble Motor Services which became part of the Stagecoach Group, using the name Stagecoach in Lancashire. Several of its routes were branded "Preston Citi"; they operated to Fulwood, Ribbleton, Penwortham, Longton, Walton-le-dale, Walmer Bridge, New Longton, Bamber Bridge, Longridge, Chorley and Leyland. Preston Bus, formerly the city's municipal bus company, also served the district and operated a route between Preston and Penwortham. 

In October 2006, Preston Bus started operating two orbital bus routes.
Competition for routes and passengers resulted in a bus war between the two companies after buses were deregulated in Great Britain. On 23 January 2009, Preston Bus was sold to Stagecoach for over £10.4 million. Routes were changed and the services were branded Stagecoach in Preston. Following a lengthy investigation which began soon after the takeover, the Competition Commission ruled on 11 November 2009 that the action by Stagecoach had adversely affected competition in the area and ordered it to sell Preston Bus. In January 2011, the Rotala Group announced they had agreed to take over Preston Bus.

Regional services
Stagecoach provides services to the nearby towns and cities of Blackpool, Blackburn, Bolton, Liverpool, Manchester, Southport and Wigan as well as Lancaster and Morecambe under the Stagecoach in Lancaster service.

Blackburn Bus Company, part of the Transdev group, operates the 152 Hotline route to Blackburn and Burnley. An independent company, John Fishwick & Sons, that provided frequent services into the city centre for Lower Penwortham, Lostock Hall, Leyland, Euxton and Chorley, ceased trading in October 2015.

National services
The national operators National Express, Eurolines, and Megabus provide services from the bus station to and from various major cities and destination en-route across the United Kingdom.

Bus stop displays
Preston was one of the first cities in the UK to have displays fitted to every bus stop which aim to provide an accurate time and destination of the next bus arriving using GPS tracking. The service, initially restricted to services within the borough, was expanded to cover Fishwick's 111 City Centre/Leyland route but was discontinued in 2011, and reinstated on some routes in 2013.

Air
Although not a public airport, Warton Aerodrome is an active airfield west of the city and is the airfield for the BAE Warton factory. BAE Samlesbury to the east of the town was an active aerodrome, with a gliding club, but today serves as a facility for BAE Systems and no longer supports flying activities.

Manchester Airport is linked by a direct rail service operated by TransPennine Express.

Walking and cycling
The Guild Wheel is a public footpath and cycle route, created in 2012 in celebration of the Preston Guild and officially opened in August of that year.  in length, it encircles Preston, linking the city to the countryside and surrounding villages. Walking and cycling on the pathway along the banks of the Lancaster Canal is popular among the city's residents and visitors.

Education

The city is home to the University of Central Lancashire. Formerly known as The Harris Institute, Preston Polytechnic, and more recently (1985–1992) as Lancashire Polytechnic, "UCLan" is now the sixth largest university in the country, with over 33,000 students.

Colleges of further and higher education
Preston College – Mainly based in Fulwood with two campuses – one near the Royal Preston Hospital for A-Levels and vocational courses, and an arts college in Moor Park. Has COVE (Centre of Vocational Excellence) status in Retail.
Cardinal Newman College – Based on a single campus in Avenham, close to the city centre. Specialises in A-Level qualifications.
TUC Education Unit – Based at Buckingham House, Preston city centre
Royal Preston Hospital – A teaching hospital, with a proportion of medical students from the University of Manchester based here for their clinical training.

High schools

Archbishop Temple School
Ashton Community Science College
Broughton High School
Christ the King Catholic High School
Corpus Christi Catholic High School
Fulwood Academy
Moor Park High School
Our Lady's Catholic High School
Preston Muslim Girls High School

Public health
Preston has a number of public and private hospitals, including:
Fulwood Hall Hospital, a private hospital in Fulwood operated by Ramsay Health Care UK, providing a wide range of services
Greater Lancashire Hospital, a private hospital in Ribbleton operated by Bespoke Health Care Ltd, providing a limited range of services
Royal Preston Hospital, a general and teaching public hospital at Fulwood

Media
Preston has a number of local radio stations:
Greatest Hits Radio Lancashire – Preston and Blackpool, classic hits
Rock FM – Preston and Blackpool, pop music

Other regional stations which include Preston within their coverage include:
BBC Radio Lancashire – Lancashire wide news, talk and classic hits (Broadcast from Blackburn)
Heart North West – across the North West, pop (Broadcast from Manchester)
Smooth North West – across the North West, easy-listening (Broadcast from Manchester)
Capital Manchester and Lancashire - across the North West, pop (Broadcast from Manchester)

The Lancashire Evening Post is based in Fulwood.

Blog Preston is a hyperlocal news website which provides community news, views and information about the city.

Television is provided by ITV Granada, the ITV franchise holder for the North West region, BBC North West, the regional BBC station for the North West region, and a local TV service for Blackpool and Preston, That's Lancashire, from studios at the Northern Lights Business Centre in the University of Central Lancashire's Media Factory building.

VisitPreston.com is a website that "showcases everything that Preston has to offer to all audiences", providing information on topics such as business investment, education, tourism, etc. It is provided by key local stakeholders including the Preston City Council, Lancashire County Council, University of Central Lancashire, Preston Business Improvement District, and The Chase creative consultants.

Sport

Preston North End F.C.

Preston North End F.C. were one of the founder members of the Football League and the first team to be crowned English football champions. They play at Deepdale Football Ground which was also the original site of the National Football Museum. The museum closed in 2011 in preparation for its move to Manchester due to funding issues.

Dick, Kerr's Ladies, one of the most famous early women's football teams in Britain, called Preston home. Preston were champions of the Football League in its first two seasons, but have not won it since. Their last major trophy came in 1938 when they won the FA Cup, and they have not played top division football since 1961. They are one of the few English league clubs to have been champions of all four tiers of the English professional league.

UCLan Sports Arena
The UCLan Sports Arena is the University of Central Lancashire's multi-million pound sporting venue, catering for a wide range of outdoor sports such as football, rugby, athletics, hockey, tennis, netball and cycling on a 64-acre site. Open to students and the wider community, the arena is the city's premier multi-sports venue.

The arena is located in Lea, approximately two miles from the university's main campus in Preston. A shuttle bus operates for students on Monday-Saturdays from outside the UCLAN Students' Union building in Fylde Road. As well as being the home of a number of university sporting clubs, the arena also hosts various public sporting clubs including the Preston Harriers Athletics Club and the Preston Springsfields Tennis Club.

The arena has a 1.5km cycle track and a 0.75km junior cycle track, open for use by individuals, clubs and cycle races/meetings. It is often used for cycle racing by the university's cycling club, as well as local and regional events and at such times is closed to general users.

Golf
Preston has a number of golf clubs with 18-hole courses, including:
 Ashton and Lea Golf Club, in Lea to the west of Preston
 Longridge Golf Club, in Longridge to the northeast of Preston 
 Penwortham Golf Club, in Penwortham on the southwest bank of the River Ribble
 Preston Golf Club, in Fulwood in the north of Preston.

Most clubs operate on a membership basis, and usually allow playing and non-playing visitors. Some also provide driving bays or ranges, and may provide further facilities such as restaurants and pro shops.

The Ingol Village Golf Club operated in Ingol in Preston's northwest from 1981 until its closure in 2017, when it was deemed nonviable due to dwindling membership.

Other sports
Speedway racing, then known as Dirt Track Racing was staged at Farringdon Park in the late 1920s and early 1930s. The Preston team raced in the English Dirt Track League of 1929 and the Northern League of 1930 and 1931. The best known rider of the team was Joe "Iron Man" Abbott who went on to Test Match successes riding before the war for Belle Vue. After the war Joe appeared for Harringay and Bradford.

Preston is home to many other sports leagues and clubs.
Rugby union: Preston Grasshoppers R.F.C., established in 1869, play in the Northern Premier League, the fifth tier of the English league system.
Cricket: Preston Cricket Club, founded in 1882 and based at West Cliff, compete in the Northern Premier Cricket League. Many other cricket clubs are based in Preston, with many competing in locally based competitions such as the Palace Shield.
Hockey: Preston Hockey Club was established in 1903.
Mountaineering: Preston Mountaineering Club is based in the town and has been in existence for over 70 years.
Roller derby: Preston is also home to Lancashire's first roller derby league; Preston Roller Girls, have been playing since 2011.

Attractions
 

Popular attractions around Preston include:
Avenham and Miller Parks: located a short walk from the centre of the city on the banks of the River Ribble, these large parks rank amongst the finest examples of traditional Victorian parkland in the North West of England.
British Commercial Vehicle Museum located in the nearby town of Leyland, approximately six miles (10 km) south of the city, the museum displays antiquarian buses, early fire engines and other historical and commercial vehicles produced by the British manufacturing industry.
Harris Museum, Art Gallery & Preston Free Public Library: located in the city centre, the museum has collections on archaeology and local history; also fine art including decorative art, costume, and textiles, with a focus on local works.
Lancashire Infantry Museum: located at Fulwood Barracks, the museum claims to be the "largest Regimental archive and the premier centre for military historical research in the North of England."
Lancaster Canal: from its terminus and boat basin at Ashton-on-Ribble the canal provides narrowboat cruising and a scenic cycle path and walk (approximately 22 miles) to Lancaster and destinations north.
Museum of Lancashire: located a short walk from Preston bus station, the museum hosts historical collections on the theme of "Lancashire Through Time". On 30 September 2016 the museum closed to the general public due to council budget cuts. In July 2019 the council stated it was their "ultimate ambition" for the museum to reopen.
 Preston Market Hall and Box Market: located on the site of the historic Covered Market and Fishmarket, traders sell local fresh produce, hot and cold foods to dine-in or take-away, artesan beer and coffee, gifts and bric-à-brac. Open Monday-Saturday.
 Preston Minster, a grade II* building, dating from at least 1094, although most of it was rebuilt in the nineteenth century; it is the parish church of Preston.
Ribble Steam Railway: a preserved railway running along Preston Dock, the museum includes workshops (where preservation work is undertaken), a visitor centre and cafe, and offers rides on restored steam trains on operating weekends.
 St Walburge's Church: located about a 15-20 minute walk from Preston Railway Station, free guided tours are available around midday on Saturdays. At certain times of the year, tours of the spire (the tallest in England for a church that is not a cathedral) are available; tickets are limited and are available from the church in return for a recommended donation.

Notable people

 
 
 Sir Richard Arkwright was born in Preston and developed his water frame in the building now known as Arkwright House
 Leo Baxendale, who drew the comic characters Dennis the Menace, the Bash Street Kids and Minnie the Minx for The Beano.
 Stu Bennett, WWE wrestler, lived in Preston until the age of six
 Holly Bradshaw, track and field athlete
 Clarke Carlisle, footballer and TV personality, born and brought up in Preston
 Hugh Carthy, Pro Peloton cyclist EF Pro Cycling
 Josh Charnley, Warrington Wolves rugby league player and England international, born in Preston
 Helen Clitheroe, athlete
 Joseph Delaney, author of science fiction and fantasy books, born in Preston
 Tupele Dorgu, actress famous for her role as Kelly Crabtree in the British ITV soap-opera Coronation Street, born in Preston
 Anulka Dziubinska, model and actress who was the Playboy centrefold in May 1973, born and raised in Preston
 Tim Farron MP, Member of Parliament for Westmorland and Lonsdale and Leader of the Liberal Democrats
 Sir Tom Finney, footballer, played for Preston North End and England, born in Preston
 Andrew 'Freddie' Flintoff, England and Lancashire cricketer as well as a current broadcaster, born in Preston. Granted freedom of the city following England's Ashes victory of 2005.
 Benjamin Franklin, one of the Founding Fathers of the United States, lived briefly on Friargate before returning to America; a Blue Plaque on the wall of the building commemorates the location
 Lieutenant-General Sir John Bagot Glubb, better known as Glubb Pasha, born in Preston in 1897
 Nigel Greenwood, footballer who played for Preston North End
 Edmund Robert Harris, local solicitor and former Prothonotary for Lancashire, born and died in Preston. Harris was the principal benefactor of the Harris Museum, Harris Institute or Art School, Harris Technical School and the Harris Orphanage.
 A. J. Hartley, award-winning, bestselling novelist
 Lubaina Himid, Turner Prize-winning artist
 Susan Hanson, actress, famous for her role as Diane Hunter (aka 'Miss Diane') in the ITV soap opera Crossroads, which she played from 1965 until 1987, was born in Preston.
 Mary Anne Hobbs, English BBC Radio One DJ and music journalist, was born in Preston
 William Thomas Hughes, Prison escapee and mass murderer, born in Preston in 1946
 John Inman, actor famous for his role as Mr. Humphries in Are You Being Served?, was born in Preston
 Phil Jones, Manchester United footballer, was born in Preston. He attended Balshaw's CE High School in Leyland
 Anne Jessopp, first ever female CEO of the Royal Mint was born in Preston. Attended Kirkham Grammar School
 Stacey Kemp, (former competitive pair skater born 1988)
 Sarah Ann Kennedy, voice of Miss Rabbit in Peppa Pig and Nanny Plum in Ben and Holly's Little Kingdom, works at the University of Central Lancashire in Preston as a lecturer in animation
 Simon Kerrigan, cricketer
 Ian Kirkham, saxophone player for the group Simply Red, born in Preston
 Mark Lawrenson, TV presenter, footballer and pundit was born in Penwortham, just south of the city centre and attended the former Preston Catholic College
 Thomas Lawson, football player
John Boyle O'Reilly, Irish writer, journalist and civil rights activist lived in Preston from 1859 to 1863, with his uncle and aunt. He worked at the Preston Guardian while living there.
 Nick Park, animator and creator of Wallace and Gromit was born in Preston. There is a bronze statue of the two characters in the town, which was unveiled by Park in September 2021.
 Robert W. Service, poet and writer associated with the Yukon Gold Rush, was born in Preston and lived for a time on Winckley Street in the city centre. There is a Blue Plaque commemorating him on Christian Road, near the railway station
 Ranvir Singh, TV presenter and newsreader, born in Preston
 Howard Stableford, Radio and TV broadcaster, former presenter of the BBC's "Tomorrow's World"
Francis Thompson, Victorian poet and ascetic, born in Winckley Street and has a memorial plaque there
 Steve Walsh, Leicester City footballer, hails from the Preston suburb of Fulwood

Twin cities/towns
Preston is twinned with:

References

Bibliography

External links
Preston City Council
Visit Preston
Preston City Centre Statue Trail 

 
Populated places established in the 1st millennium
City of Preston, Lancashire
Cities in North West England
Towns in Lancashire
Unparished areas in Lancashire